Longfield is an English surname. Notable people with the surname include:

Anne Longfield (born 1960), former Children's Commissioner for England
Chuck Longfield (born 1956), American philanthropist and non-profit sector expert
Cynthia Longfield (1896–1991), Irish entomologist and explorer
Geoffrey Longfield (1909–1943), English cricketer and Royal Air Force officer
John Longfield (1805–1889), Irish officer in the British Army 
Judi Longfield (born 1947), Canadian politician
Lloyd Longfield (born 1956), Canadian politician
Richard Longfield (1802–1889), Irish politician
Richard Longfield, 1st Viscount Longueville (1734–1811), Irish politician
Robert Longfield, American composer
Samuel Mountiford Longfield (1802–1884), Irish lawyer and economist
Sarah Longfield (born 1994), American musician and You Tuber
Tom Longfield (1906–1981), English cricketer
Zoe Longfield (1924–2013), American artist

English-language surnames